Liu Chuanxing (born 30 July 1999) is a Chinese professional basketball player for the Bay Area Dragons of the East Asia Super League (EASL). He has been a member of the China men's national basketball team.

Early career 
Liu played for the youth team of the Guangdong Southern Tigers. He averaged 18.6 points and 8.6 rebounds per game at the National Youth League.

Professional career

Qingdao Eagles (2018–2021) 
On 27 August 2018, Liu joined the Qingdao Eagles of the Chinese Basketball Association. As a rookie, he played in four games, posting an average of 0.5 points, 0.5 rebounds and 0.3 blocks in 3.0 minutes of action per game for the 2018–19 season.

In the 2019–20 season, Liu started in 28 of 43 games, averaging 7.8 points, 6.7 rebounds and 1.0 blocks in 17.81 minutes per game while shooting 58.2 percent from the field.

In the 2020–21 season, Liu made 34 starts in 51 games, logging an average of 9.4 points, 8.1 rebounds and 1.1 blocks in 21.67 minutes of play per game while shooting 66.8 percent from the field.

Brisbane Bullets (2021–2022) 
On 7 September 2021, Liu signed a two-year deal with the Brisbane Bullets of the Australian National Basketball League (NBL) as a Development Player and a Special Restricted Player. On 3 December, Liu made his NBL debut against the Tasmania JackJumpers but went scoreless across four minutes of playing time.

Bay Area Dragons (2022–present)
In June 2022, Liu signed with the Bay Area Dragons.

National team career 
Liu made his international debut for China at the 2021 FIBA Asia Cup Qualifiers. In a game against Chinese Taipei, he logged 16 points and nine rebounds.

The following month, Liu suited up for the national team at the 2020 FIBA Men's Olympic Qualifying Tournaments, where he only played in one game.

Player profile 
He was given the nickname "Big Liu" in the NBL for his height. Liu set a record as the tallest player in league history.

References

External links 
Liu Chuanxing at nbl.com.au
 Liu Chuanxing at cbaleague.com
 Liu Chuanxing at the 2020 FIBA Olympic Qualifying Tournament Victoria, Canada at fiba.basketball
 Liu Chuanxing at the 2021 FIBA Asia Cup Qualifiers at fiba.basketball

1999 births
Living people
Basketball players from Henan
Brisbane Bullets players
Chinese expatriate sportspeople in Australia
Chinese men's basketball players
Centers (basketball)
Qingdao Eagles players
Expatriate basketball people in Australia
Chinese expatriate basketball people in the Philippines
Philippine Basketball Association players
Bay Area Dragons players